The Manus boobook (Ninox meeki) is a small owl. It has an unmarked brown facial disk, rufous crown and back, barred white flight feathers and tail, and whitish underparts with rufous streaking.

This species is endemic to Manus Island, in the Admiralty Islands. It lives mainly in forests, but will appear in trees near humans, and will sometimes occupy riparian habitats. It is fairly common throughout its limited range.

References 

 The Owl Pages - Manus Hawk Owl

Manus boobook
Birds of the Admiralty Islands
Manus boobook